Cumann Poblachta na hÉireann was a political party established by the Irish Republican Army in 1936. It existed until 1937.

It was founded in Barry's Hotel, Dublin, on 7 March 1936, and decided to adopt a policy of abstentionism with regard to any seats it might win in elections to the Free State Oireachtas and the Parliament of Northern Ireland.

The party was led by prominent IRA members. Paddy McLogan served as party chairman; former IRA chief of staff Andy Cooney was another leading member. Madge Daly (sister of Ned Daly and Kathleen Clarke), Fionna Plunkett (sister of Joseph Plunkett), Seán MacBride, Joseph P. Brennan, Peadar O'Donnell and Moss Twomey were also members. General Eoin O'Duffy attended the founding meeting but never became a member.

In 1936, during the legislative period of the 8th Dáil, the party ran two candidates in by-elections:

In the Galway by-election, held in the Galway constituency on 13 August 1936, Count Plunkett ran as a joint Cumann Poblachta na hÉireann/Sinn Féin candidate. Losing his deposit, he polled 2,696 votes (a 4.09 percent share of the vote).

In the Wexford by-election, held in the Wexford constituency on 17 August 1936, Stephen Hayes polled 1,301 votes (a 2.85 percent share of the vote) and lost his deposit.

References

Defunct political parties in the Republic of Ireland
Irish Republican Army (1922–1969)
Irish republican parties
Political parties established in 1936
Political parties disestablished in 1937
1936 establishments in Ireland
1937 disestablishments in Ireland